Bell House or Bellhouse may refer to:

Places

Canada
 Bell House (1910), a notable residence in Nutana, Saskatoon, Saskatchewan, Canada
 Bellhouse Provincial Park, British Columbia

Ireland
 Bell House (Ireland), part of Cambridge House Grammar School's house system named after musician Derek Bell

United Kingdom
 Bell House Gallery, Buntingford, England
 Bell House, Dulwich, England
 Ramsden Bellhouse, a village in Essex
 Bell House Common, Hanworth, Norfolk, England
 Bell House, Milton of Campsie, Stirlingshire, Scotland, a Prospect 100 best modern Scottish building
 Bell houses, houses of George Bell

United States
 Willie Bell House, Mason's Bend, Alabama, a Rural Studio project
 Bell House (Prattville, Alabama)
 Bell House (Jonesboro, Arkansas)
 Lake-Bell House, Prairie Grove, Arkansas
 Bell House (Searcy, Arkansas)
 James George Bell House, a National Register of Historic Places listing in Los Angeles County, California
 Bell Farmhouse, Newark, Delaware
 R. H. and Jessie Bell House, a National Register of Historic Places listing in Ada County, Idaho
 Alvin Bushnell Bell House, Ida Grove, Iowa
 Foster/Bell House, Ottumwa, Iowa
 Hill McClelland Bell House, Des Moines, Iowa
 George and Annie Bell House, a National Register of Historic Places listings in Douglas County, Kansas
 Bell House (Edmonton, Kentucky)
 John Bell House (Lexington, Kentucky)
 Page-Bell House, a National Register of Historic Places listings in Trimble County, Kentucky
 Bell-Varner House, Leitersburg, Maryland
 Bell-Spalding House, Ann Arbor, Michigan
 Bell House (Starkville, Mississippi), a National Register of Historic Places listing in Oktibbeha County, Mississippi
 M. Fred Bell Rental Cottage, Fulton, Missouri
 Brandon-Bell-Collier House, Fulton, Missouri
 Jasper Newton Bell House, a National Register of Historic Places listing in Lancaster County, Nebraska
 Mary E. Bell House, Center Moriches, New York
 The Bell House (New York City), a comedy/music venue in Brooklyn, New York
 Bell-Sherrod House, Enfield, North Carolina
 Bryan-Bell Farm, Pollocksville, North Carolina
 Bell House (Fredericktown, Ohio), a National Register of Historic Places listing in Knox County, Ohio
 Bell's First Home, a National Register of Historic Places listing in Highland County, Ohio
 Dr. James Bell House, Cleveland, Ohio
 John C. Bell House, Philadelphia, Pennsylvania
 Isaac Bell House, Newport, Rhode Island
 Allen-Bell House, a National Register of Historic Places listing in Bastrop County, Texas
 John Y. Bell House, a National Register of Historic Places listings in DeWitt County, Texas
 Rogers-Bell House, a National Register of Historic Places listing in Travis County, Texas
 Faires-Bell House, a National Register of Historic Places listing in Collin County, Texas
 Bell-Johnson House, a National Register of Historic Places listings in Cache County, Utah
 Bell House (Colonial Beach, Virginia)
 Howard-Bell-Feather House, Riner, Virginia
 Dr. Robert and Jessie Bell House, a National Register of Historic Places listing in Spokane County, Washington
 John and Margaret Bell House, Spring Prairie, Wisconsin

Other uses
 Bellhouse (barque), a British barque
 Bellhouse (surname)

See also
 John Bell House (disambiguation)
 Belhus (disambiguation)
 Bell Farm (disambiguation)
 Bell housing, auto part
 House v. Bell, 2006 United States Supreme Court case